
Year 426 (CDXXVI) was a common year starting on Friday (link will display the full calendar) of the Julian calendar. At the time, it was known in Rome as the Year of the Consulship of Theodosius and Valentinianus (or, less frequently, year 1179 Ab urbe condita). The denomination 426 for this year has been used since the early medieval period, when the Anno Domini calendar era became the prevalent method in Europe for naming years.

Events 
 By place 

 Roman Empire 
 Emperor Theodosius II gives orders to destroy the buildings and pagan temples at Olympia (Greece). The statue of Zeus is brought to Constantinople.

 Europe 
 Flavius Aetius, Roman general (magister militum), starts a 10-year campaign against the Visigoths in southern Gaul.
 King Gunderic of the Vandals accepts the request of the Alans in Hispania to become their ruler (approximate date).

 Mesoamerica 
 K'inich Yax K'uk' Mo' becomes the founder of the pre-Columbian Maya civilization at Copán (modern Honduras).

 Religion 
 Augustine of Hippo publishes the De Civitate Dei, City of God.
 Sisinnius becomes Archbishop of Constantinople.

Births 
 Liu Shao, emperor of the Liu Song Dynasty (d. 453)

Deaths 
 Fu Liang, official of the Liu Song Dynasty (b. 374)
 Xie Hui, general of the Liu Song Dynasty (b. 390)
 Xu Xianzhi, official of the Liu Song Dynasty (b. 364)
 Zhang, empress dowager of the Liu Song Dynasty

References